Portsmouth is a city in Rockingham County, New Hampshire, United States. At the 2020 census it had a population of 21,956. A historic seaport and popular summer tourist destination on the Piscataqua River bordering the state of Maine, Portsmouth was formerly the home of the Strategic Air Command's Pease Air Force Base, since converted to Portsmouth International Airport at Pease.

History
American Indians of the Abenaki and other Algonquian languages-speaking nations, and their predecessors, inhabited the territory of coastal New Hampshire for thousands of years before European contact.

The first known European to explore and write about the area was Martin Pring in 1603. The Piscataqua River is a tidal estuary with a swift current, but forms a good natural harbor. The west bank of the harbor was settled by European colonists in 1630 and named Strawbery Banke, after the many wild strawberries growing there. The village was protected by Fort William and Mary on what is now New Castle Island. Strategically located for trade between upstream industries and mercantile interests abroad, the port prospered. Fishing, lumber and shipbuilding were principal businesses of the region. Enslaved Africans were imported as laborers as early as 1645 and were integral to building the city's prosperity. Portsmouth was part of the Triangle Trade, which made significant profits from slavery.

At the town's incorporation in 1653, it was named "Portsmouth" in honor of the colony's founder, John Mason. He had been captain of the English port of Portsmouth, Hampshire, after which New Hampshire is named.

When Queen Anne's War ended in 1712, Governor Joseph Dudley selected the town to host negotiations for the 1713 Treaty of Portsmouth, which temporarily ended hostilities between the Abenaki Indians and the colonies of Massachusetts Bay and New Hampshire.

In 1774, in the lead-up to the Revolution, Paul Revere rode to Portsmouth warning that the British Royal Navy was coming to capture the port. Although Fort William and Mary protected the harbor, the Patriot government moved the capital inland to Exeter, which ensured that it would be under no threat from the Royal Navy, which bombarded Falmouth (now Portland, Maine) instead on October 18, 1775. Portsmouth was the destination for several of Beaumarchais's ships containing materiel, such as artillery, tents, and gunpowder, to help the American revolutionary effort. African Americans helped defend Portsmouth and New England during the war. In 1779, 19 enslaved African Americans from Portsmouth wrote a petition to the state legislature and asked that it abolish slavery, in recognition of their war contributions and in keeping with the principles of the Revolution. Their petition was not answered, but New Hampshire later abolished slavery.

Thomas Jefferson's 1807 embargo against American trade with Britain severely disrupted New England's trade with Canada, and several local businessmen went bankrupt. Portsmouth was host to numerous privateers during the War of 1812. In 1849, Portsmouth was incorporated as a city.

Once one of the nation's busiest ports and shipbuilding cities, Portsmouth expressed its wealth in fine architecture. It has significant examples of Colonial, Georgian, and Federal style houses, some of which are now museums. Portsmouth's heart has stately brick Federalist stores and townhouses, built all-of-a-piece after devastating early 19th-century fires. The worst was in 1813 when 244 buildings burned. A fire district was created that required all new buildings within its boundaries to be built of brick with slate roofs; this created the downtown's distinctive appearance. The city was also noted for the production of boldly wood-veneered Federalist furniture, particularly by the master cabinet maker Langley Boardman.

The Industrial Revolution spurred economic growth in New Hampshire mill towns such as Dover, Keene, Laconia, Manchester, Nashua and Rochester, where rivers provided water power for the mills. It shifted growth to the new mill towns. The port of Portsmouth declined, but the city survived Victorian-era doldrums, a time described in the works of Thomas Bailey Aldrich, particularly in his 1869 novel The Story of a Bad Boy.

In the 20th century, the city founded a Historic District Commission, which has worked to protect much of the city's irreplaceable architectural legacy. In 2008, the National Trust for Historic Preservation named Portsmouth one of the "Dozen Distinctive Destinations". The compact and walkable downtown on the waterfront draws tourists and artists, who each summer throng the cafes, restaurants and shops around Market Square. Portsmouth annually celebrates the revitalization of its downtown (in particular Market Square) with Market Square Day, a celebration dating back to 1977, produced by the non-profit Pro Portsmouth, Inc.

Portsmouth shipbuilding history has had a long symbiotic relationship with Kittery, Maine, across the Piscataqua River. In 1781–1782, the naval hero John Paul Jones lived in Portsmouth while he supervised construction of his ship Ranger, which was built on nearby Badger's Island in Kittery. During that time, he boarded at the Captain Gregory Purcell house, which now bears Jones' name, as it is the only surviving property in the United States associated with him. Built by the master housewright Hopestill Cheswell, an African American, it has been designated as a National Historic Landmark. It now serves as the Portsmouth Historical Society Museum.

The Portsmouth Naval Shipyard, established in 1800 as the first federal navy yard, is on Seavey's Island in Kittery, Maine. The base is famous for being the site of the 1905 signing of the Treaty of Portsmouth which ended the Russo-Japanese War. Though US President Theodore Roosevelt orchestrated the peace conference that brought Russian and Japanese diplomats to Portsmouth and the Shipyard, he never came to Portsmouth, relying on the Navy and people of New Hampshire as the hosts. Roosevelt won the 1906 Nobel Peace Prize for his diplomacy in bringing about an end to the War.

Geography 

Portsmouth is drained by Berrys Brook, Sagamore Creek and the Piscataqua River, which is the boundary between New Hampshire and Maine.

Climate 
Portsmouth has a humid continental climate (Dfb) in spite of its maritime position, due to prevailing inland winds. Summers are moderately warm with winter days averaging around the freezing point, but with cold nights bringing it below the required  isotherm to have a humid continental climate. With high year-round precipitation, the cold winters can often be very snowy and summers wet.

Demographics

Portsmouth is the sole city in Rockingham County, but the fourth-largest municipality, with fewer people than the towns of Derry, Londonderry, and Salem.

As of the census of 2010, there were 21,233 people, 10,014 households, and 4,736 families residing in the city. The population density was 1,361.1 people per square mile (524.4/km). There were 10,625 housing units at an average density of 681.1 per square mile (262.3/km). The racial makeup of the city was 91.5% White, 1.7% African American, 0.2% Native American, 3.5% Asian, 0.01% Pacific Islander, 0.7% some other race, and 2.3% from two or more races. Hispanic or Latino of any race were 2.8% of the population.

There were 10,014 households, out of which 20.2% had children under the age of 18 living with them, 35.5% were headed by married couples living together, 8.3% had a female householder with no husband present, and 52.7% were non-families. 39.2% of all households were made up of individuals, and 11.8% were someone living alone who was 65 years of age or older. The average household size was 2.03, and the average family size was 2.75.

In the city, the population was spread out, with 16.6% under the age of 18, 7.7% from 18 to 24, 32.2% from 25 to 44, 27.6% from 45 to 64, and 15.9% who were 65 years of age or older. The median age was 40.3 years. For every 100 females, there were 94.2 males. For every 100 females age 18 and over, there were 92.6 males.

For the period 2010–2014, the city's estimated median annual household income was $67,679, and the median family income was $90,208. Male full-time workers had a median income of $58,441 versus $45,683 for females. The city's per capita income for the city was $42,724. About 4.0% of families and 7.6% of the population were below the poverty line, including 6.9% of those under age 18 and 7.1% of those age 65 or over.

Economy

Heinemann USA is based in Portsmouth. Before its dissolution, Boston-Maine Airways (Pan Am Clipper Connection), a regional airline, was also headquartered in Portsmouth.
Companies with headquarters in Portsmouth include packaged software producer Bottomline Technologies and frozen yogurt maker Sweet Scoops.

Top employers
According to the city's 2020 Comprehensive Annual Financial Report, the top ten employers in the city are:

Arts and culture
The Portsmouth Downtown Historic District encompasses the city's historic urban core and Market Square.

Sites of interest

 USS Albacore Museum & Park – a museum featuring the USS Albacore, a U.S. Navy submarine used for testing, which was decommissioned in 1972 and moved to the park in 1985. The submarine is open for tours.
 Buckminster House – built in 1725, formerly a funeral parlor.
 Discover Portsmouth Center – visitor center, gallery, gift shop, John Paul Jones Historic House, walking tours, short film on the history of Portsmouth; operated by the Portsmouth Historical Society.
 Green Elephant Vegetarian Bistro – Thai restaurant at 35 Portwalk Place opened in 2015.
 Cabot Lyford four public sculptures – including "The Whale" and "My Mother the Wind," a seven-ton blank granite statue which was installed on Portsmouth's waterfront in 1975.
 The Music Hall – a 900-seat theater opened in 1878.
 New Hampshire Theatre Project – founded in 1986, a non-profit theater organization producing contemporary and classical works, and offering educational programs.
 North Church – historic church, the steeple of which is visible from most of Portsmouth
The Player's Ring Theater – a black-box theater that produces original work from local playwrights.
 Pontine Theatre – produces original theater works based on the history, culture and literature of New England at their 50-seat black box venue.
 Portsmouth Athenæum – a private membership library, museum and art gallery open to the public at certain times.
 Portsmouth Harbor Lighthouse – first established in 1771, the current structure was built in 1878 and is open for monthly tours from May through September.
 Prescott Park Arts Festival – summer entertainments in Portsmouth's waterfront park since 1974.
 Rockingham Hotel and the Library Restaurant – historic former hotel and contemporary restaurant. Built in 1885, it is a prominent early example of Colonial Revival architecture.
 Seacoast Repertory Theatre – founded in 1988, a professional theater troupe.
 Strawbery Banke Museum – a neighborhood featuring several dozen restored historic homes in Colonial, Georgian and Federal styles of architecture. The site of one of Portsmouth's earliest settlements.
 Whaling Wall – Painting of Isles of Shoals Humpbacks created by Robert Wyland, situated on the back of Cabot House Furniture. It is in disrepair, and restoration has not been allowed by the owners of Cabot Furniture.
 Portsmouth African Burying Ground – a memorial park and the only archeologically verified 18th-century African burying ground in New England.

Historic house museums

 Richard Jackson House (1664)
 John Paul Jones House (1758)
 Governor John Langdon House (1784)
 Tobias Lear House (1740)
 Moffatt-Ladd House (also called William Whipple House) (1763)
 Rundlet-May House (1807)
 MacPheadris-Warner House (1716)
 Wentworth-Coolidge Mansion (1750)
 Wentworth-Gardner House (also called Wentworth House) (1760)
 Henry Sherburne House (1766)

Sports
The Seacoast United Phantoms are a soccer team based in Portsmouth. Founded in 1996, the team plays in the Northeast Division of USL League Two (USL2), one of the unofficial fourth tier leagues of the American Soccer Pyramid.

Freedom Rugby Football Club is a men's rugby union team based in Portsmouth, founded in the summer of 2014. The club is an active member of USA Rugby and New England Rugby Football Union (NERFU).

Government
The city of Portsmouth operates under a council-manager system of government. Portsmouth elects a nine-member at-large City Council to serve as the city's primary legislative body. The candidate who receives the most votes is designated the Mayor (currently Deaglan McEachern), while the candidate receiving the second-highest vote total is designated the Assistant Mayor (currently Joanna Kelley). While the mayor and council convene to establish municipal policy, the City Manager (currently Karen Conard) oversees the city's day-to-day operations.

Portsmouth is part of New Hampshire's 1st congressional district, currently represented by Democrat Chris Pappas. Portsmouth is part of the Executive Council's 3rd district, currently represented by Republican Janet Stevens. In the State Senate, Portsmouth is represented by Democrat Rebecca Perkins Kwoka. In the State House of Representatives, Portsmouth is divided among the 25th through 31st Rockingham districts.

Politically, Portsmouth is a center of liberal politics and a stronghold for the Democratic Party. Ronald Reagan was the last Republican presidential nominee to carry the city in his 1984 landslide reelection. In 2016, Portsmouth voted 67.70% for Hillary Clinton in the presidential election, 62.53% for Colin Van Ostern in the gubernatorial election, 64.48% for Maggie Hassan in the senatorial election, and 62.16% for Carol Shea-Porter in the congressional election. In 2014, Portsmouth voted 70.05% for Maggie Hassan in the gubernatorial election, 67.34% for Jeanne Shaheen in the senatorial election, and 68.34% for Carol Shea-Porter in the congressional election. In 2012, Portsmouth voted 67.56% for Barack Obama in the presidential election, 70.16% for Maggie Hassan in the gubernatorial election, and 68.50% for Carol Shea-Porter in the congressional election.

In March 2014, Portsmouth became the first municipality in New Hampshire to implement protections for city employees from discrimination on the basis of gender identity, by a 9–0 vote of the city council.

Education
 Community College System of New Hampshire, Great Bay Community College – Portsmouth campus
 Franklin Pierce University – Portsmouth campus
 Granite State College – Portsmouth campus and on-site location at Great Bay Community College

Media

Print
 The New Hampshire Gazette
 The Portsmouth Herald

Radio
 WSCA-LP Portsmouth Community Radio 106.1 FM
 WHEB 100.3 FM rock formatted

Infrastructure

Transportation
The city is crossed by Interstate 95, U.S. Route 1, U.S. Route 4, New Hampshire Route 1A, New Hampshire Route 16, and New Hampshire Route 33.

The Cooperative Alliance for Seacoast Transportation (COAST) operates a publicly funded bus network in the Seacoast region of New Hampshire and neighboring Maine including service in, to and from Portsmouth. C&J is a private intercity bus carrier connecting Portsmouth with coastal New Hampshire and Boston, as well as direct service to New York City. Wildcat Transit, operated by the University of New Hampshire, provides regular bus service to the UNH campus in Durham and intermediate stops. The service is free for students, faculty and staff and $1.50 for the general public. Amtrak's Downeaster train service, is available in Dover and Durham, nearby to the northwest. Allegiant Air offers scheduled airline service from Portsmouth International Airport at Pease (PSM).

Sister cities
Portsmouth's sister cities are:
 Agadir, Morocco
 Carrickfergus, Northern Ireland, United Kingdom
 Kitase, Ghana
 Nichinan, Japan
 Pärnu, Estonia
 Severodvinsk, Russia

Portsmouth also has friendly relations with:
 Portsmouth, England, United Kingdom
 Santarcangelo di Romagna, Italy
 Szolnok, Hungary

Notable people

See also

Portsmouth Public Library (New Hampshire)
2006 Little League World Series, when a team from Portsmouth advanced to the quarter-finals
USS Portsmouth, 4 ships

References

Further reading

External links

 
 Greater Portsmouth Chamber of Commerce

 
Cities in New Hampshire
Cities in Rockingham County, New Hampshire
Former colonial and territorial capitals in the United States
Populated places established in 1630
Populated coastal places in New Hampshire
1630 establishments in the Thirteen Colonies